Diamond Bitch is the debut studio album by Polish pop-rock recording artist Doda. It is her first solo album recorded after the rock band Virgin disbanded. It was released in Poland on July 27, 2007. Becoming a massive success, the album went straight to number one, and stayed there for five straight weeks.

The album was re-released in August 2008 under the same title. It contains all the songs from the standard version, except for the song "To Jest To" which was removed due to plagiarism, but included a new single called "Nie daj się", which was a national success. Apart from the new song, it also contained two karaoke tracks, a cover of Madonna's "Like a Virgin", and a DVD containing all of her and Virgin's music videos plus extra behind the scenes content.

Description 
Diamond Bitch is Doda's first solo album. It includes 12 pop rock songs. All of them are sung in Polish and were produced by a Swedish music producer Mark Tysper. Each copy of the album contains a poster and is decorated with pink feathers.

Chart performance 
It was announced that the album went gold before it was even released due to it being pre-ordered by over 15,000 people in Poland. On the week it released, it debuted at number one on the official Poland Album Chart and stayed there for five weeks, becoming one of the most successful albums of the year. The album was eventually certified platinum with sales of 45,000 units.

Track listing

Charts and certifications

Charts

Certifications

Personnel
 Doda – vocals
 Mark Tysper – keyboards, bass, guitar, drums, programming, vocals
 Marcin Trojanowicz – keyboards, programming, vocals
 Sebastian Piekarek – guitar, vocals
 Krzysztof Patocki – drums
 Anita Konca – vocals
 Paweł Łuczak – keyboards

Release history

External links 
 
 Diamond Bitch at Deezer

References

2007 debut albums
Doda (singer) albums